Professional Go players in Japan are given the title of "Honorary" (or "Lifetime") title holder if they either win the title ten times in a row, or have won the title five times in a row or ten times in total and reach the age of 60 years or retire.
Below is a list of the honorary title holders and which title they are honored for.

Honorary Kiseis 
 Fujisawa Hideyuki won the Kisei 6 times in a row from 1976 to 1982.
 Kobayashi Koichi won the Kisei 8 times in a row from 1986 to 1993.
 Iyama Yuta won the Kisei 9 times in a row 2013 to 2021.

Honorary Meijins 
 Cho Chikun won the Meijin 5 times in a row from 1980 to 1984.
 Kobayashi Koichi won the Meijin 7 times in a row from 1988 to 1994.

Honorary Honinbos 
 Takagawa Kaku won the Honinbo 9 times in a row from 1952 to 1960. 
 Sakata Eio won the Honinbo 7 times in a row from 1961 to 1967.
 Ishida Yoshio won the Honinbo 5 times in a row from 1971 to 1975.
 Cho Chikun won the Honinbo 10 times in a row from 1989 to 1998.
 Iyama Yuta won the Honinbo 11 times in a row from 2012 to 2022.
These players are called the 22nd / 23rd / 24th / 25th / 26th Honinbo, respectively.

Honorary Judans 
 There have been no Honorary Judans.

Honorary Tengens 
Rin Kaiho won the Tengen 5 times in a row from 1988 to 1993.
Iyama Yuta won the Tengen 5 times in a row from 2015 to 2019.

Honorary Ozas 
 Kato Masao won the Oza 8 times in a row from 1982 to 1989.

Honorary Goseis 
 Otake Hideo won the Gosei 6 times in a row from 1980 to 1985.
 Kobayashi Koichi won the Gosei 6 times in a row from 1988 to 1993.
 Iyama Yuta won the Gosei 5 times in a row from 2012 to 2016.

See also

References

Go players
Go